Glenn "Mike" Prax (born May 25, 1956) is an American politician. He is a Republican representing District 3 in the Alaska House of Representatives.

Political career 

Prax held Seat G on the Fairbanks North Star Borough Assembly from 1997 to 2000.

In January 2020, former Alaska House member Tammie Wilson resigned to work for the state Office of Children's Services. Alaska Governor Mike Dunleavy appointed Prax to fill the seat on February 18, and he was sworn in on February 24. He is running for election to a full term.

As of June 2020, Prax sits on the House Education and Energy committees.

References 

Republican Party members of the Alaska House of Representatives
Living people
1956 births
21st-century American politicians